Cork Capwell railway station was the terminus of the Cork and Macroom Direct Railway (CMDR) in County Cork, Ireland.  It was located just off the Summerhill South Road and the station building remains in use by Bus Éireann as offices.

History

The station opened on 30 September 1879. Regular passenger services were withdrawn on 2 March 1925.

Routes

Further reading

References

Disused railway stations in County Cork
Railway stations opened in 1879
Railway stations closed in 1925